Fernando Hamilton Barbosa Elias, also known as Mito or Mito Elias (born 9 August 1965) is a Cape Verdean artist, visual artist and a poet.

Biography
Mito Elias was born in Praia.
- Santiago, Cape Verde. Studied art in Arco – Lisbon - Portugal, between 1989 and 1992. He has lived and worked in the diaspora since 1989, developing an original imagery language consisting of the search for Creole oral traditions and tales, a symbiotic style between wash, writing and multimedia, he has thus named as Mare Calamus. Ever since 1983 Mito Elias has regularly presented his exhibits, work drawn, painted, written or video-graphed, travelling to all corners of the world. He is represented in many an exhibition all over the world, deserving special mention the following: Mundial Bank - USA, BNU – Macao (China), Afro Brasil Museum - São Paulo - Brazil, Regional Government of the Autonomous Region of the Azores, Presidency of the Cape Verde Republic, Embassy of Cape Verde in Lisbon, and Ethnic Communities' Council of Victoria, Australia.  He lives in Melbourne - Australia since 2013. He runs Fandata Studio, together with his wife, who is also visual artist. He works as a Visual Arts Tutor and Community facilitator in many different projects around Melbourne.

Exhibitions

Most important group exhibitions
2018: Personnel Experience – Footscray Community Arts Centre. 2012: The Script Road - Si Stau (noção 1ª de Macau) - Old Court House – Macau. 2008: Tentativa de Agotar un Lugar Africano – In Continum -  Centre d'Art Santa Mònica -  Barcelona – Spain, ECOS À BOLINA (Na Rota De Calamus) - CINUSP - S.Paulo - Brasil, AFRICA NOW! - Emerging Talents From a Continent on The Move - World Bank - Washington DC - USA.  2007: Le Bourgeois Experimental - S. German des Prés. - Paris – France.  2006: LUSOVIDEOGRAFIA – Espaço Durex - Rio de Janeiro – Brasil, 2002 : I Bienal de S.Tomé e Princípe – S. Tomé e Príncipe. 2001: Arte nas Terras Raianas. Moura – Portugal. 1998: Universidad de Lecce - Itália. 1997: The Karantonha Exhibit – Boston Center For The Arts – USA 1996: Mosteiros dos Jerónimos - Lisboa - Portugal.  1994: Culturgest - CGD - Lisboa - Portugal,  1993: Hotel Méridièn - Luanda - Angola.  1992: Palácio Foz - Lisboa - Portugal.  1991: AR.CO - Lisboa - Portugal.  1984: Corêto Visual - Corêto da Praça/Centro Cultural Português - Praia - Cabo Verde.

Most important solo exhibitions   
2019: SATISfashion - Metro West - Melbourne - Australia. 2017: qp – as part of the Fringe in The West – FCAC – Melbourne – Australia. 2016: MADATONG – Bromley Gallery – Windsor - Melbourne – Australia. 2015: SCRIPTA (Writings of the World) – as part of the Big West Festival – African Town – Footscray – Melbourne – Australia, [RE]alphabetika @Díli – Fundação Oriente – Díli – East Timor. 2014: Fandata - Fo Guang Yuan Art Gallery – Melbourne – Australia,  [Ex]Isle (Painted Tales) – As part of the Latin Festival - Ventana Fiesta - Frankston Arts Centre – Australia. 2012: CRIOLANTUS – PCIL - Cultural Palace – Praia – Cape Verde,  [RE]alphabetika @ Cascais - Parque Palmela – Cascais - Portugal,  Private Z(oo)M - Macau Literary Festival - Polytechnic Institute of Macao – Macao – China. 2011: Amor Sta La - Galeria da Ordem dos Médicos – Lisbon - Portugal, 10x9.11 - (with Binga de Castro) – The Music House - Praia – Cape Verde,  Pé Na Boti - Vídeo_Phonics Witnesses – CV Cultural House - Rotterdam - Netherlands,  Paredis & Numbrason (Collaboration with Ana Rita Pires) - CAC Tejo - V.V.Rodão – Portugal,  Private Z(oo)M - Tempo de Bichos - Afro-Brazil Museum - S.Paulo – Brazil.  2010: Majina - 30 anos 100 Lennon - Buchholz Bookstore – Lisbon – Portugal,  POEMix (Collaboration with Binga de Castro) – IILP (International Institute of Portuguese Language) - Praia - Cape Verde, Na Fai Minotu - UNICV (University of Cape Verde) - Praia - Cape Verde, De Pareidolia (Collaboration with Ana Rita Pires) - PCIL - Praia - Cape Verde. 2009: Nó di Sulada - WMDC (World Music and Dance Centre) - Rotterdam - Netherlands. 2008: Nu Bai – BCA - Atlantic Comercial Bank Auditorium - Praia - Cape Verde, FishBonEye - S.Vicente City Hall - Mindelo – Cape Verde.  2007: Na Som Di Kriolu – Expominas - Belo Horizonte – Brazil. 2006: Só Pamodi Bó (1 recordai pa Luís Morais) – Library Orlando Ribeiro – Lisbon – Portugal,  Li-Sim-Sim - Kerry Center - Beijing - China, Fisherman's Wharf - Macao – China. 2005: Dia Santo Na Lém Di Mulato – PCIL - Cultural Palace - Praia - Cape Verde, Promessa Di Marlargo - Mabooki Bookshop - Lisbon – Portugal. 2004: Timenti Lua Ka Subi - PCIL - Cultural Palace - Praia - Cape Verde. 2003: The Cape Verdean Blues (A Blue Note 4 HS) – National Library - Praia - Cape Verde.  2002: N' - Ler Devagar Bookstore - Lisbon – Portugal,  Mare Calamus - Jorge Vieira Museum - Beja – Portugal. 2001: The Hitchiker Drumbeat - The Garage Studio - North Providence – USA. 1999: Kurasson Di Sibitchi – Cultural Palace - Praia/CCM – Cultural Centre of Mindelo - Cape Verde, Serenata Em Bilingue - Teatro Baltazar Dias - Funchal – Madeira.1998: Insulano (11ª ilha) - Galeria Municipal da Amadora – Portugal, Águalusa & Terracota - Recreios da Amadora - Portugal, Lantuna Na Mei Di Mar - EXPO'98 - Lisboa – Portugal.  1997: Lágrimas de Indigo - INAC - Praia/ Cultural Centre of Mindelo - Cape Verde. 1995: Mitomorfoses - INAC - Praia/ People’s Palace - Mindelo - Cape Verde,  Duet - Galeria Gymnasium - Lisbon – Portugal. 1989: 15 Alternative Snapshots from Cape Verde – CV Association - Lisbon - Portugal.  1983: Painting & Crafts – French Cultural Centre - Praia - Cape Verde.

Awards
August 2001 – Prize Salúquia for best painting at the group exhibition Arte nas Terras Raianas - Moura – Portugal.  May 2005 – Citizenship Honor medal from the City of Praia – Cape Verde Islands.   October 2005 - First Class Medal for Cultural Services – Praia - Cape Verde Islands. June 2007 – Cultural Honor from the City of Praia – Cape Verde Islands.  July 2010 – Vulcan Prize for Cultural Services – Praia – Cape Verde Islands.

References

External links
Mitomorphosis blog 
Saatchi Ar
Macanese Review (Revista Macau), September 2006

1956 births
Living people
Cape Verdean poets
Cape Verdean painters
People from Praia